This is a list of supermarket chains in Belgium. As of 2011, in Belgium three major groups form more than two thirds of the market: Colruyt group  27%, Delhaize 22.5% and Carrefour 22%. Then there are Aldi 11%, Lidl 5.6% and Makro 4.5%.

Current supermarket chains

Defunct supermarket chains

 Écomarché (owned by Les Mousquetaires, now rebranded to Intermarché Contact or Intermarché Super)
GB Supermarkets, Taken over by Carrefour. Before that, the stores belonged to the now defunct GIB Group, almost all GB stores were later rebranded to become Carrefour stores:
Maxi GB (now: Carrefour)
Super GB (now: Carrefour Market)
GB Express (now: Carrefour Express)
 Bigg's Continent (now: Carrefour hypermarkets)
 Jawa (was a supermarket chain, all its stores were taken over in 1995 to become Match supermarkets)
Profi (was a discount store owned by Louis Delhaize Group, rebranded to Smatch supermarket)
Unic (rebranded to Super GB and later Carrefour GB.)

References 

Belgium
 
Supermarket